Drunken Silenus is a 1620 painting by Anthony van Dyck, now in the Gemäldegalerie Alte Meister in Dresden.

External links
https://web.archive.org/web/20151125164735/http://sartle.org/artwork-in-museum/gem%C3%A4ldegalerie-alte-meister

Mythological paintings by Anthony van Dyck
1620 paintings
Collections of the Gemäldegalerie Alte Meister
Paintings depicting Greek myths